Program trading is a type of trading in securities, usually consisting of baskets of fifteen stocks or more that are executed by a computer program simultaneously based on predetermined conditions. Program trading is often used by hedge funds and other institutional investors pursuing index arbitrage or other arbitrage strategies. There are essentially two reasons to use program trading, either because of the desire to trade many stocks simultaneously (for example, when a mutual fund receives an influx of money it will use that money to increase its holdings in the multiple stocks which the fund is based on), or alternatively to arbitrage temporary price discrepancies between related financial instruments, such as between an index and its constituent parts.

According to the New York Stock Exchange, in 2006 program trading accounts for about 30% and as high as 46.4% of the trading volume on that exchange every day. Barrons breaks down its weekly figures for program trading between index arbitrage and other types of program trading. As of July 2012, program trading made up about 25% of the volume on the NYSE; index arbitrage made up less than 1%.

History
Several factors help to explain the explosion in program trading. Technological advances spawned the growth of electronic communication networks. These electronic exchanges, like Instinet and Archipelago Exchange, allow thousands of buy and sell orders to be matched very rapidly, without human intervention.

In addition, the proliferation of hedge funds with all their sophisticated trading strategies have helped drive program-trading volume.

As technology advanced and access to electronic exchanges became easier and faster, program trading developed into the much broader algorithmic trading and high-frequency trading strategies employed by the investment banks and hedge funds.

Program trading firms
Program Trading is a strategy normally used by large institutional traders. Barrons shows a detailed breakdown of the NYSE-published program trading figures each week, giving the figures for the largest program trading firms (such as investment banks).

Index arbitrage
Index Arbitrage is a particular type of Program Trading which attempts to profit from price discrepancies between the basket of stocks which make up a stock index and its derivatives (such as the future based on that index). As of July 2012, it makes up less than 5% of the active Program Trading volume on the NYSE daily.

Premium buy and sell execution levels
The "premium" (PREM) or "spread" is the difference between the stock index future fair value and the actual index level. As the derivative is based on the index, the two should normally have a very close relationship. If there is a sufficiently large difference the arbitraging program will attempt to buy the relatively cheap level (whether that is the basket of stocks which make up the index or the index future) and sell the relatively expensive product, making money from the price discrepancy. The fair value calculation takes into account the time to expiration of the future contract, the dividends received from holding all the stocks, and the interest cost of buying the stocks.

See also
 Automated trading system
 Algorithmic trading 
 High-frequency trading
 Alternative trading system
 Electronic trading platform
 Dark pool

References

Share trading

sv:Algoritmisk handel